Krichim Dam is a dam on the Vacha River, Bulgaria. It is part of the Vacha Cascade Joint Implementation Project involving three more dams and four power stations. The three existing dams on the Vacha River are the Vacha Dam, Tsankov Dam, and the Kamak Dam. The  concrete dam was in its implementation stage as of 2011.

The dam supports the 80 MW Krichim Hydro Power Plant.

External links

References

Dams in Bulgaria
Hydroelectric power stations in Bulgaria
Buildings and structures in Pazardzhik Province
Buildings and structures in Plovdiv Province